Gus tf Sakai or Gustafrizal Busra, (born in Sumatera Barat, West Sumatera, 13 August 1965, age 53 years), is an Indonesian writer. His name Gus tf Sakai is used when he writes proses, while Gus tf used when he writes poems. He settles in Payakumbuh, West Sumatra. He graduated from elementary, middle, and high schools in Payakumbuh. Then he went to the Faculty of Animal Science, Andalas University, Padang (completed 1994).

His creativity evolved from his early childhood, which starts from the drawing, writing poems and essays on the diary. His first publication was a short story that won a contest when he was in 6th grade, 1979. Then he often joined the competition and won. After publishing his works with a variety of pseudonyms until the end of high school in 1985, he decided to live by writing. Since then, he uses two names: Gus and Gus tf Sakai. In 1996, he returned to Payakumbuh. Together with his wife, Zurniati, he decided to live and settle in the village with their three children.

Some of his works have been translated into some languages. A collection of short stories, ‘Kemilau Cahaya dan Perempuan Buta’’, who won the Lontar Literary Award 2001 and translated into English and published by the Lontar Foundation under the title ''The Barber and Other Short Stories'’, which was translated by Justine FitzGerald, Anna Nettheim, and Linda Owens.

Publications
 Gustafrizal Busra 
 Gus tf Sakai 
 Gus tf Sakai 
 Gus tf Sakai 
 Gus tf Sakai 
 Gus tf Sakai 
 Gus tf Sakai 
 Gus tf Sakai 
 Gus tf Sakai

References

External links 
Gus tf Sakai: Leaving his own story up to the imagination
  Kumpulan Cerpen Kompas
   Books by Gus tf Sakai

1965 births
Living people
Indonesian writers
Andalas University alumni